Le Cousin is a 1997 French film directed by Alain Corneau.

Plot 
The film deals with the relationship of the police and an informant in the drug scene.

Awards and nominations
Le Cousin was nominated for 5 César Awards but did not win in any category.

References

External links

1997 films
1997 crime films
Films about drugs
Films directed by Alain Corneau
French crime films
1990s French-language films
1990s French films